Majam is a village in Gogunda Tehsil in Udaipur district in the Indian state of Rajasthan. The District headquarter of the village is Udaipur.

The postal head office of Majam is Badgaon.

Geography
It is 35 kilometers away from the Udaipur district headquarters.

Demographics
As per Population Census 2011, the total population of Majam is 1239.  Males constitute 52% of the population and females 48%.

Literacy
The literacy rate of Majam village is 44.37% as per 2011 census which is very low compared to 66.11% of Rajasthan.

References

Villages in Udaipur district